Bustiello  is one of 44 parishes (administrative divisions) in Tineo, a municipality within the province and autonomous community of Asturias, in northern Spain.

The postal code is 33878.

Parishes in Tineo